Handball at the 2010 South American Games in Medellín was held from March 20 to March 30. All games were played at Coliseo Unidad Deportiva Ditaires Itagüi.

Medal summary

Medal table

Men

Women

References

2010 South American Games
Qualification tournaments for the 2011 Pan American Games
2010 in handball
2010